Sölve Cederstrand (1900–1954) was a Swedish screenwriter and film director.  He was one of the most prolific screenwriters active in Swedish cinema during the 1930s alongside Torsten Lundqvist and Gösta Stevens.

Selected filmography
 First Mate Karlsson's Sweethearts (1925)
 40 Skipper Street (1925)
 The Rivals (1926)
 The Ghost Baron (1927)
 Black Rudolf (1928)
 Artificial Svensson (1929)
 Cavaliers of the Crown (1930)
 Ulla, My Ulla (1930)
 The Red Day (1931)
 Colourful Pages (1931)
 Ship Ahoy! (1931)
 A Night of Love by the Öresund (1931)
 Tired Theodore (1931)
 Servant's Entrance (1932)
 The Song to Her (1934)
 Andersson's Kalle (1934)
 Close Relations (1935)
 Under False Flag (1935)
 The People of Bergslagen (1937)
 Playing Truant (1949)
 Bohus Battalion (1949)
 My Sister and I (1950)
 Teacher's First Born (1950)
 My Name Is Puck (1951)
 Classmates (1952)
 Dance on Roses (1954)
 Darling of Mine (1955)

References

Bibliography
 Iverson, Gunnar, Soderbergh Widding, Astrid & Soila, Tytti. Nordic National Cinemas. Routledge, 2005.
 Larsson, Mariah & Marklund, Anders. Swedish Film: An Introduction and Reader. Nordic Academic Press, 2010.
 Wallengren, Ann-Kristin.  Welcome Home Mr Swanson: Swedish Emigrants and Swedishness on Film. Nordic Academic Press, 2014.

External links

1900 births
1954 deaths
Swedish film directors
Swedish screenwriters
People from Stockholm